State of Swat (locally called as Dera Swat) was a kingdom established in 1849 that was ruled by chiefs known as Akhunds. It was then recognized as a princely state in alliance with the British Indian Empire between 1926 and 1947, after which the Akhwand acceded to the newly independent state of Pakistan. Swat continued to exist as an autonomous region until it was dissolved in 1969, and incorporated into Khyber Pakhtunkhwa Province (formerly called NWFP). The area it covered is now divided between the present-day districts of Swat, Dir, Buner and Shangla.

History

The Swat region has been inhabited for more than two thousand years and was known in ancient times as Udyana. The location of Swat made it an important stopping point for many invaders, including Alexander the Great and Sultan Mahmud of Ghazni. In the second century BCE, Swat formed part of the Buddhist civilisation of Gandhara.

Swat was a center of Hinayana Buddhism and of the Mahayana school that developed from it. The Chinese pilgrim Fa-Hsien, who visited the valley around 403 CE, mentions 500 monasteries. After him, Sun Yun (519 CE), Xuanzang (630 CE), and Wu-kung (752 CE) visited Swat as well and praised the richness of the region, its favourable climate, the abundance of forest, flowers and fruit-trees and the respect in which Buddhism was held.

The Kushan dynasty ruled for four centuries until it was overrun by the White Huns in the 5th century CE and the glory of the Gandhara era came to an end. Xuanzang recorded the decline of Buddhism. According to him, of the 1400 monasteries that had supposedly been there, most were in ruins or had been abandoned. The monks still quoted from the scriptures but no longer understood them. There were grapes in abundance but cultivation of the fields was sparse.

Tajiks had been living and ruling the Swat for centuries until their rule ended by Yousafzai Pashtun tribes under the leadership of malak Ahmad Khan in a battle in 1519 A.D.

The modern area of Swat was ruled sporadically by religious leaders, who variously took the title of Akhoond, also spelt Akhund or Akond. The Akhund of Swat who died in 1878 was particularly famous as the subject of a well known humorist poem by Edward Lear, The Akond of Swat. The nonsensical poem suggests a faraway place and a mystical person, at least through the eyes of a Victorian poet and painter.

The Islamic State of Swat was established in 1849 under Sayyid Akbar Shah with Sharia law remaining in force, but the state was in abeyance from 1878 to 1915. Thereafter Sayyid Abdul-Jabbar Shah, nephew of Sayyid Akbar Shah, was made ruler by a local Jirga and had trouble exercising power. In 1917 another Jirga appointed Miangul Golshahzada Abdul-Wadud, founder of the dynasty of Swat. The British recognised this ruler and the state as a princely state in 1926. Following the independence of Pakistan in 1947, the ruler acceded the state to Pakistan, while retaining considerable autonomy. The ruler of Swat was accorded a 15-gun hereditary salute in 1966. This was followed by the abolition of the state in 1969, resulting from a campaign initiated against autocratic rule by the Swat Liberation Movement (SLM). As a result, the State was incorporated into current day Pakistan.

Demographics 
The people of Swat are mainly Yousafzai Pashtuns and Gujjars.

Government 

The rulers of Swat held the title Amir-e Shariyat and from 1918 were known as Badshah; the title changed to Wali in 1926 when it became a Princely State of the British Raj. Since 1969 the former princely state has been under a civil administration as part of Khyber Pakhtunkhwa. The Miangul family is still prominent in Pakistan and has held a variety of appointed and elective posts.

See also 
 Khyber Pakhtunkhwa

References

 The Yusufzai State of Swat on valleyswat.net

Further reading 
 The Last Wali of Swat: An Autobiography as Told by Fredrik Barth (Asian Portraits), by Fredrik Barth
 
 Sultan-i-Rome, Swat State, 1915–1969, From Genesis to Merger: An Analysis of Political, Administrative, Socio-Political, and Economic Development, Karachi: Oxford University Press (2008), 
 Sultan-i-Rome. Forestry in the Princely State of Swat and Kalam (North-West Pakistan): A Historical Perspective on Norms and Practices, NCCR IP6 Working Paper No. 6. Zurich: Department of Geography, University of Zurich (2005)
<ref.yousafzai ki sargazishit by allah bakhash yousafi>
 Miangul Aurangzeb: The last Vali Ahad (Crown Prince) of the former Swat State

External links 
Gaju Khan Yusufzai 
Yusufzai at Khyber.org
 Government of Khyber Pakhtunkhwa
 Details on the ruling family of Swat
 Daily Times: NWFP Religious Background
 Geographical Journal article on Swat

Former subdivisions of Pakistan
Swat District
States and territories established in 1849
History of Khyber Pakhtunkhwa
Princely states of India
Muslim princely states of India
Princely states of Pakistan
Former kingdoms